Mark Hewlett (born 26 December 1974) is a Rhodesian-born radio and television personality most prominent in his adopted home of New Zealand. In 2003 Hewlett was crowned Fear Factor grand champion.

As a child, his parents fled Rhodesia to settle in Canada and the United States during the Rhodesian Bush War. The family then moved back to their native Zimbabwe in 1980 and then to neighbouring South Africa in 1987. He was schooled at Michaelhouse in the KwaZulu-Natal Midlands, where he matriculated from in 1992. In 1996, after a year at Natal University and a stay in London, Hewlett, for the fifth time, emigrated overseas this time to Los Angeles for a change of pace. There he was discovered by a photographer and began his modelling career. Following his move Hewlett was diagnosed with Type 1 diabetes: he now injects himself four times a day.

During his stay in Los Angeles Hewlett successfully competed in the Fear Factor Grand Champion edition which he won and took home $100,000 a portion of which he gave to his New Zealand-based parents. Hot on the heels of his Fear Factor win, Hewlett moved to New Zealand so he could be closer to his parents, he appeared in numerous television shows and was a daily host on radio station ZM.

See also
 List of New Zealand television personalities

References

External links 
Mark at the Cape Argus
Sing Like a Superstar profile

1974 births
Living people
People from Durban
New Zealand radio presenters
New Zealand television presenters
Zimbabwean emigrants to New Zealand
Alumni of Michaelhouse